Anam Biswas is a Bangladeshi director, screenwriter, composer and writer. He is the director and screenwriter of Debi, released in 2018. In 2016, he won Bangladesh National Film Award for Best Screenplay for the film Aynabaji.

Selected films

As a composer 
 Dub Satar - 2011

As a director 
 Debi - 2018
 WTFry - What the Fry (web film, released in Zee5) - 2021
 Dui Diner Duniya (web film,released in Chorki) - 2022
 Football 71 - (2023)
 Rongila Kitab (web series) - (2023)

As a screenwriter 
 Aynabaji - 2016
 Debi - 2018

Awards and nominations 
National Film Awards

References

External links 
 

Bangladeshi screenwriters
Best Screenplay National Film Award (Bangladesh) winners
Bangladeshi composers
Bangladeshi male writers
Living people
Year of birth missing (living people)